Kek Jamnik (born 15 October 1991) is a Slovenian badminton player. He won the men's doubles title at the 2013 Botswana International partnered with Alen Roj.

Achievements

BWF International Challenge/Series 
Men's doubles

  BWF International Challenge tournament
  BWF International Series tournament
  BWF Future Series tournament

References

External links 
 

1991 births
Living people
Slovenian male badminton players
21st-century Slovenian people